The men's 100 metres T44 took place in Stadium Australia.

There were three heats and one final round. The T44 is for athletes who have a single amputation below the knee or have some paralysis in one or both legs.

Heats

Heat 1

Heat 2

Heat 3

Final round

References

Athletics at the 2000 Summer Paralympics